Johann Friedrich Andreas Heimerdinger (10 January 1817, Hamburg - 3 October 1882, Hamburg) was a German painter; specializing in still-lifes.

Biography 
After qualifying to enter a university, he completed a degree in education. Then, at the age of twenty-two, he left Hamburg to attend the Kunstakademie. He stayed there until 1841. Theodor Hildebrandt was his primary instructor. On Hildebrandt's recommendation, he was able to attend the Academy of Fine Arts, Munich, from 1842 to 1845. Following graduation, he made an extensive study trip throughout Switzerland, then returned to Hamburg.

There, he worked as a freelance artist and founded a "Schule für angehende Maler und Bildhauer" (School for aspiring painters and sculptors), where he taught "modern art". It proved to be a great success.

His largest exhibit was in 1869, at the Glaspalast in Munich. He held numerous smaller exhibitions at the Academy of Fine Arts, Vienna. He was primarily known for still lifes and "Trompe-l'œil" images.

He also wrote several small textbooks, notably:  Elements of drawing based on physical objects for teachers and for self-teaching as well as for technical educational institutions (1857), and  Preliminary exercises on the elements of drawing based on physical objects for children aged 7-10 years  (1868)

Sources 
 Ernst Rump: Lexikon der bildenden Künstler Hamburgs, Altonas und der näheren Umgebung. Könnecke, Hamburg 1980 (reprint of the 1912 edition), 
 "Friedrich Heimerdinger", in: Meyers Konversations-Lexikon, 4th ed. 1888–1890, vol.9, pg.85 f.

External links

1817 births
1882 deaths
19th-century German painters
19th-century German male artists
German still life painters
Trompe-l'œil artists
Academy of Fine Arts, Munich alumni
Artists from Hamburg